Pan de Azúcar is a city in the southwest of the Maldonado Department in Uruguay. It takes its name from a nearby hill (Cerro Pan de Azúcar, actually located in the neighbouring municipality of Piriápolis), topped by a huge cross.

Pan de Azúcar is also the name of the municipality to which the city belongs. It includes the zones: Pan de Azúcar, Gerona, Kilómetro 110, Nueva Carrara, Puntas de Pan de Azúcar, Laguna del Sauce, Laguna de los Cisnes.

Geography
The stream Arroyo Pan de Azúcar flows by the southwest limits of the city.

History
It was founded in October 1874 by Félix de Lizarza. Lizarra counted with the help of inhabitants from the city of San Carlos.

Its status was elevated to "Pueblo" (village) by Decree of 20 April 1887, and on 7 September 1961, it was further elevated to "Ciudad" (city) by the Act of Ley N° 12.908.

Population
In 2011, Pan de Azúcar had a population of 6,597. According to the Intendencia Departamnetal de Maldonado, the municipality of Pan de Azúcar has a population of 9,500.

 
Source: Instituto Nacional de Estadística de Uruguay

Places of worship
 Parish Church of Our Lady of Sorrows (Roman Catholic)

See also
 Maldonado Department

References

External links

INE map of Pan de Azúcar, Gerona and Ruta 37 y 9

Populated places in the Maldonado Department
Populated places established in 1874
1874 establishments in Uruguay